The discography of American pop recording artist JC Chasez consists of one studio album, one unreleased album, five singles, as well as various guest appearances and music videos. As a member of NSYNC, Chasez co-wrote and produced songs for the band, with four songs including the title track on the group's sophomore album No Strings Attached, as well as four songs on the final album Celebrity. His first solo single was the song "Blowin' Me Up (With Her Love)" for the Drumline movie soundtrack. His first solo album, Schizophrenic, was released by Jive Records in 2004, but with little promotion the album had disappointing sales, selling only about 60,000 copies in its first week. 

In 2004, Chasez began work on a sophomore album set to feature production from bandmate Justin Timberlake, Timbaland, and Jimmy Harry. The album again suffered from numerous delays and little promotion, culminating in Chasez parting ways with Jive Records.  

Chasez continues to work as a songwriter and producer for other artists, including Backstreet Boys, David Archuleta, and NU'EST.

Albums

Studio album

Unreleased album

Singles

Guest appearances

Songwriting & production credits (non-NSYNC)
All credits from AllMusic, Discogs and Melon.

Songwriting & Production Credits (*NSYNC)

References

Discographies of American artists
JC Chasez songs